María Teresa ("Mayte") Martínez Jiménez (born 17 May 1976 in Valladolid) is a Spanish athlete competing in the 800 m.  She has reached 4 consecutive finals in the World Championships (she did not take part on 2003 Championships in Paris), being third with an incredible last straight in Osaka. She took part in 2000 and 2004 Olympic Games, being eliminated in the semifinals (she was the last on both of them). She could not participate in 2008 Olympic Games in Beijing with an injury (fasciitis plantar).

Personal bests 
Outdoor

400 metres 53.67  Valladolid (01/05/2003)
800 metres 1:57.62  Osaka (28/08/2007)
1000 metres 2:33.06  Huelva (13/09/2007)
1500 metres 4:05.05  Rieti (28/08/2005)

Indoor

800 metres 1:59.52  Gent (08/02/2004)
1000 metres 2:38.80  Madrid (24/02/2005)
1500 metres 4:09.18  Birmingham, GBR (03/03/2007)

Competition record

External links

References

1976 births
Living people
Spanish female middle-distance runners
Athletes (track and field) at the 2000 Summer Olympics
Athletes (track and field) at the 2004 Summer Olympics
Olympic athletes of Spain
World Athletics Championships medalists
European Athletics Championships medalists
Valladolid city councillors
Mediterranean Games gold medalists for Spain
Mediterranean Games medalists in athletics
Athletes (track and field) at the 2005 Mediterranean Games
Sportspeople from Valladolid
21st-century Spanish women